Hemmatabad-e Olya or Hemmat Abad Olya, also known as Hemmatabad-e Bala - all meaning "Upper Hemmatabad", may refer to:
 Hemmatabad-e Olya, Kerman
 Hemmatabad-e Olya, Rafsanjan, Kerman Province
 Hemmatabad-e Olya, Lorestan